Chileka International Airport  is an international airport in Malawi. Chileka is Malawi's second international airport, the other being Kamuzu International Airport, in Lilongwe, the nation's capital city.

Facilities 
The airport's geographical coordinates are:15°40'52.0"S, 34°58'18.0"E (Latitude:-15.681111; Longitude:34.971667).

The airport has two asphalt paved runways: 10/28 measures  and 15/33 measures .

Renovations
In April 2019 scheduled renovations and extensions to the main runway were commenced, resulting in the temporary closure of runway 10/28. The renovations were initially scheduled to last for three months, with operations expected to resume in July 2019. However, several delays caused the project to take longer than anticipated, and the reopening date was pushed back at least three times. In July 2019 South African Airlines, one of the 2 major carriers serving the airport along with Ethiopian Airlines, decided to halt all operations to the airport citing several major safety concerns including the state of the runway and emergency services. This negative international attention caused significant embarrassment for local authorities and they finally began renovations in earnest.

The airport continued to be operational during this time, handling arrivals and departures of smaller aircraft on runway 15/33. During the closure, all arrivals and departures on medium range and larger aircraft operated from Kamuzu International Airport, with onward transfers to and from Chileka International Airport, on smaller aircraft.

The renovation works were finally completed in December 2019, and normal operations with both runways were resumed on 1 January 2020.

Airlines and destinations

References

External links
  Closure of Chileka Airport – Blantyre As of 18 Marc 2014.
 
 
 

Airports in Malawi
Buildings and structures in Blantyre
Buildings and structures in Southern Region, Malawi